Anisopodus curvilineatus is a species of beetle in the family Cerambycidae that was described by White in 1855.

References

Anisopodus
Beetles described in 1855